Charlie Dalton was an Irish revolutionary.

Dalton was born in 1903 and grew up around Columba's Road, Drumcondra, Dublin. He joined in Irish Volunteers in 1917, aged 14. He was recruited to join The Squad. He was a colonel in the Free State Army and participated in the Irish Army Mutiny in 1924.

In 1929, he published a memoir entitled 'With The Dublin Brigade'

His brother was Emmet Dalton.

References

People of the Irish War of Independence
People of the Irish Civil War (Pro-Treaty side)